In enzymology, an amidinoaspartase is an enzyme that catalyzes the chemical reaction

N-amidino-L-aspartate + H2O  L-aspartate + urea

Thus, the two substrates of this enzyme are N-amidino-L-aspartate and H2O, whereas its two products are L-aspartate and urea.

This enzyme belongs to the family of hydrolases, those acting on carbon-nitrogen bonds other than peptide bonds, specifically in linear amidines.  The systematic name of this enzyme class is N-amidino-L-aspartate amidinohydrolase. This enzyme is also called amidinoaspartic amidinohydrolase.

References

 

EC 3.5.3
Enzymes of unknown structure